Azerbaijan Anti-Corruption Academy (Azerbaijani: Azərbaycan Anti-Korrupsiya Akademiyası) is a non-governmental organization established in 2016 for the purpose of raising public awareness on the fight against corruption and promoting the role of education to prevent corruption in Azerbaijan. The Academy (AZACA) offers public lectures, forums, short and long-term training programs, tailor-made programs designed for specific target groups such as civil servants, students and private sector.

AZACA works in cooperation with national chapter of Transparency International, Open Government Partnership Dialogue Platform, Network of NGOs specialized in fighting against corruption, Commission on Combating Corruption, ASAN Service, etc.

AZACA involves Council of Europe certified trainers who have completed the Training-of-Trainers courses within the CoE/EU Joint Project on “Strengthening capacities to fight and prevent corruption in Azerbaijan” to deliver trainings for civil servants on "Ethics and Anti-Corruption Technique".

It is acting also as a center of excellence for research on the fight against corruption and for the preparation of anti-corruption proposals. AZACA developed “National Corruption Barometer” report for the first time in Azerbaijan, based on the methodology of the Transparency International's “Global Corruption Barometer”.

Activity 
Presentation and first lecture of the Azerbaijan Anti-Corruption Academy were organized on May 14, 2016. Conditions that were favorable to the establishment of Azerbaijan Anti-Corruption Academy, objectives and structure of Academy, as well as advantages of participating in AZAKA events, future plans of AZAKA and other information were presented at the beginning of the event. The presentation continued with an interactive discussion about corruption, main root causes of corruption, types of corruption, favourable methods of fighting against corruption and measure corruption. The next training of the Azerbaijan Anti-Corruption Academy (AZAKA) was held on May 28, 2016.

Presentation event of AZACA was held at the National Administration School of France on 24 July 2016. 25 participants - public officials and civil society delegates from France, Egypt, Algeria, Morocco, Ukraine, Brazil, Burkina Faso, Djibouti, Chad, Benin, Niger, and Madagascar were attended at presentation.

The first edition of AZACA quarterly bulletin was published in September 2016.

Series trainings on "Ethics and Anti-Corruption Technique" for members of the civil service with the support of Commission on Combating Corruption and “ASAN Training and Education Center” were held by AZACA in Masalli, Barda, Gabala, Guba and Sabirabad regions in January 2018. More than 120 civil servants attended these trainings.

One of trainings for civil servants on "Ethics and Anti-Corruption Technique" was held on February 16, 2018, with the participation of Vice-Rector for Student Affairs at ADA University, and Head of the ASAN Legal Acts Expertise Sector.

Another training by AZACA on "Anti-Corruption and Ethical Behavior" was held at Academy of Public Administration for master students on February 23, 2017.

See also 
 International Anti-Corruption Academy
 ASAN service
 Commission on Combating Corruption
 Open Government Partnership
 Open government in Azerbaijan
 Corruption in Azerbaijan
 Anti-money laundering in Azerbaijan

References list 

Anti-corruption agencies
Anti-corruption non-governmental organizations